Timo Seppänen (born 22 July 1987) is a Finnish former professional ice hockey defenseman who most notably played in the Liiga and Elitserien. Seppänen was drafted 185th overall in the 2006 NHL Entry Draft by the Pittsburgh Penguins.

Playing career
He began his professional career in 2005 with HIFK in the SM-liiga. Un-signed by the Penguins, Seppänen continued his career in the SM-liiga playing with HPK and KalPa.

Following the 2012–13 season, going scoreless in 26 regular season games with HC TPS, Seppänen ended his eight-year playing career.

References

External links
 

1987 births
Living people
Finnish ice hockey defencemen
HIFK (ice hockey) players
HPK players
KalPa players
Pittsburgh Penguins draft picks
Ice hockey people from Helsinki
Södertälje SK players
HC TPS players